Airdrie Transit is a public transportation system which serves the city of Airdrie, Alberta, Canada, which is located just north of Calgary within the Calgary–Edmonton Corridor. Service consists of the Intercity Express (ICE) regional transit service, three conventional fixed routes within Airdrie and ACCESS Airdrie a paratransit service. 

Airdrie Transit operates the Calgary Region's first regional transit service, the Intercity Express. The service operates during peak morning and afternoons between Airdrie and downtown Calgary on two routes, Route 901 East and Route 902 West. The service also operates on weekends and holidays between Airdrie (Sierra Springs) and McKnight-Westwinds (C-Train) station via CrossIron Mills mall on Route 900.

Changes
Effective May 2, 2011 changes were made to the local fixed route and ICE services. The improvements were based on public consultations and included schedule and route adjustments to the ICE service and associated changes to the local feeder network. The most significant change being the routing of the ICE service to a downtown express routing via Deerfoot to Calgary in the morning and returning from Calgary in the afternoon.

Routes
1 (Green)- serves Sagewood, Fairways, Woodside, Canals, Willowbrook, Creekside Crossing, Downtown, Old Town, Sunridge, Jensen, Stonegate, and East Lake Industrial neighborhoods
2 (Orange)- serves Reunion, Fairways, Woodside, Williamstown, Silver Creek, Willowbrook, Sunridge, Jensen, Old Town, Downtown, Ridgegate, Edgewater, Summer Hill, and Sierra Springs neighborhoods
3 (Blue)- serves Big Springs, Thorburn, Meadowbrook, King's Heights, Ravenswood, Yankee Valley, Luxstone, Canals, Pointe of View, Creekside, Prairie Springs, Coopers Crossing, and Sierra Springs neighborhoods
900 (Intercity Express Airdrie-CrossIron Mills-McKnight-Westwinds (C-Train))
901 (Intercity Express East)
902 (Intercity Express West)

See also

 Public transport in Canada

References

External links
Airdrie Transit - Getting You There
History of Regional Transit at Calgary, Alberta

Airdrie, Alberta
Transit agencies in Alberta